Congo Town is a small village located in South Andros district, part of Andros Island in the Bahamas.

It is served by the South Andros Airport. In 2010, the population was 90.

See also
 List of cities in the Bahamas
 Districts of the Bahamas
 Islands of the Bahamas

References

Populated places in the Bahamas
Andros, Bahamas